Troubadour, TX is a nationally syndicated American documentary television series following various singers and songwriters across Texas. The series features behind the scenes looks into the lives of the various artists, known as "Troubadours", as they encounter both professional and personal challenges. The series attempts to take a naturalistic approach with minimal editing to provide a more honest look into the life of singers and songwriters.

Production and broadcast history
Casting for the series began in April 2011 with talent searches in numerous cities across Texas. Troubadour, TX premiered on September 24, 2011 on 140 stations across the United States. The series is primarily filmed in Texas and is narrated by American country singer-songwriter Stacy Dean Campbell. Many of the episodes feature "showcase performances" from selected Troubadours, recorded at Studio 41E. The series is produced by Dallas-based London Broadcasting and 41 Entertainment. The first season concluded on May 26, 2012 with a second season being announced during the finale.

Episodes

Season 1 (2011–2012)

Notes

External links
 
 

2010s American reality television series
2011 American television series debuts
English-language television shows
Television shows set in Texas
Television shows filmed in Texas